Simplicia armatalis is a litter moth of the  family Erebidae. It is found in Australia.

The wingspan is about 30 mm.

References

Herminiinae
Moths described in 1866